Mumtaz Ali is a name, and may refer to:
 Sayyid Mumtaz Ali, (1860 – 1935) - Muslim scholar and women rights advocate.
 Mumtaz Ali, (15 March 1905 – 6 May 1974) – Indian dancer and character actor.
 Mumtaz Ali Kazi, (25 June 1928 – 25 January 1999) - Pakistani scientist
 Mumtaz Ali Khan - Cabinet Minister of BJP  in Karnataka.
 Mumtaz Ali Shah - Pakistani civil servant
 Mumtaz Ali Khan Chang - Pakistani politician
 Mumtaz Ali Chandio - Pakistani politician
 Mumtaz Ali Bhutto - Pakistani politician